Elections to Cookstown District Council were held on 21 May 1997 on the same day as the other Northern Irish local government elections. The election used three district electoral areas to elect a total of 16 councillors.

Election results

Note: "Votes" are the first preference votes.

Districts summary

|- class="unsortable" align="centre"
!rowspan=2 align="left"|Ward
! % 
!Cllrs
! % 
!Cllrs
! %
!Cllrs
! %
!Cllrs
! % 
!Cllrs
!rowspan=2|TotalCllrs
|- class="unsortable" align="center"
!colspan=2 bgcolor="" | Sinn Féin
!colspan=2 bgcolor="" | SDLP
!colspan=2 bgcolor="" | UUP
!colspan=2 bgcolor="" | DUP
!colspan=2 bgcolor="white"| Others
|-
|align="left"|Ballinderry
|28.9
|2
|bgcolor="#99FF66"|29.5
|bgcolor="#99FF66"|2
|19.3
|1
|21.5
|1
|0.8
|0
|6
|-
|align="left"|Cookstown Central
|22.5
|1
|25.7
|1
|bgcolor="40BFF5"|31.6
|bgcolor="40BFF5"|2
|20.2
|1
|0.0
|0
|5
|-
|align="left"|Drum Manor
|bgcolor="#008800"|32.1
|bgcolor="#008800"|2
|19.8
|1
|21.7
|1
|12.7
|0
|13.7
|1
|5
|- class="unsortable" class="sortbottom" style="background:#C9C9C9"
|align="left"| Total
|28.0
|5
|25.4
|4
|23.7
|4
|18.4
|2
|4.5
|1
|16
|-
|}

District results

Ballinderry

1993: 2 x SDLP, 2 x UUP, 1 x Sinn Féin, 1 x DUP
1997: 2 x SDLP, 2 x Sinn Féin, 1 x UUP, 1 x DUP
1993-1997 Change: Sinn Féin gain from UUP

Cookstown Central

1993: 2 x UUP, 2 x SDLP, 1 x DUP
1997: 2 x UUP, 1 x SDLP, 1 x DUP, 1 x Sinn Féin
1993-1997 Change: Sinn Féin gain from SDLP

Drum Manor

1993: 1 x Sinn Féin, 1 x UUP, 1 x SDLP, 1 x DUP, 1 x Independent Unionist
1997: 2 x Sinn Féin, 1 x UUP, 1 x SDLP, 1 x Independent Unionist
1993-1997 Change: Sinn Féin gain from DUP

References

Cookstown District Council elections
Cookstown